Josef Stabel (born 21 September 1948) is a retired German football goalkeeper and later manager.

References

1948 births
Living people
German footballers
1. FC Kaiserslautern players
Association football goalkeepers
Bundesliga players
German football managers
Wormatia Worms managers
1. FC Kaiserslautern managers
FC 08 Homburg managers
FK Pirmasens managers